Kansas City Blues may refer to::

Sport 
Kansas City Blues (1885-1901), an early minor league baseball franchise
Kansas City Blues (Western League), an 1898–1900 baseball team of the Western League
Kansas City Blues (American Association), a 1902–54 minor-league baseball team
Kansas City Blues (USA Rugby), a Rugby Super League team founded in 1966
Kansas City Blues (ice hockey), a minor-league hockey team
Kansas City Blues (NFL), a Kansas City-based NFL team in 1924
Kansas City Blues (AFL), a 1934 American Football League team

Music 
 Blues#Urban_blues, a subgenre of blues music known as Kansas City blues
 "Jim Jackson's Kansas City Blues", a song by Blues singer Jim Jackson